The Gennady Zyuganov presidential campaign, 2012 was the presidential campaign of Gennady Zyuganov in the 2012 Russian presidential election. This was the fourth presidential campaign of Zyuganov, who had been a candidate in both the 1996, 2000, and 2008 elections.

Campaigning

In September 2011, Zyuganov became the CPRF's candidate for the 2012 presidential election.  Zyuganov declared that the election would be a referendum on "a 20 year experiment" of the liberalization of the Russian political sphere. Zyuganov referred to the existing government as a, "gang of folks who...have humiliated the country."

In the 2012 Russian presidential election on 4 March 2012, Zyuganov once again came in second place by receiving 17% of the vote.

Positions

Zyuganov promised a return to socialism and an end to Russia's economic decline.

See also
Gennady Zyuganov presidential campaign, 1996
Gennady Zyuganov presidential campaign, 2000
Gennady Zyuganov presidential campaign, 2008

References

Zyuganov
presidential campaign, 2012
Zyuganov, 2012